is a public park surrounding Nagoya Castle in Kita-ku, Nagoya, Japan

History 
So in effect the park's name translated means "Nagoya Castle Park", since it lies to the north of the castle and used to be a part of its wider compound.

The park is located on the site of the former Ofuke-niwa (御深井庭) or Ofuke-oniwa (御深井御庭) of the Edo period. The Ofuke Garden was a large garden centering on a pond that was left over from the low marshland that existed on the north side of the castle when Nagoya Castle was built, and served as a defense for the north side of the castle. The pond had a number of small islands and the area was cultivated as a Japanese garden. It is said that the third shōgun Tokugawa Iemitsu admired this garden when he visited and used it as a model for the Fukiage part of Edo Castle. Located west of the Ofuke Garden was lord Tokugawa Naritomo's Shin Goten (新御殿 New Palace) in what is today Horibata-chō (堀端町). 

After the Meiji era, the land was reclaimed and used as a military drill ground. The area was converted into a public park in 1931.

Facilities 
The park includes Aichi Prefectural Gymnasium and Nagoya City Archives, as well as other facilities.  Periodically, flower exhibits are held in this park.  In addition, the park itself has many flowers being cultivated inside, including famously its wisteria, which usually bloom at the end of April and beginning of May, and especially its cherry blossoms, which usually bloom at the beginning of April.

Access
Shiyakusho Station and Meijō Kōen Station provide access to the park.  Meijō Kōen Station is named after this park, and the subway line it is on, namely the Meijō Line, is named after Nagoya Castle which is inside the park.

See also
Nagoya Castle

References

External links

 Information from the Nagoya Convention and Visitor's Bureau

Parks and gardens in Nagoya
Nagoya Castle